Julius LeBlanc Stewart (September 6, 1855, Philadelphia, Pennsylvania — January 4, 1919, Paris, France), was an American artist who spent his career in Paris. A contemporary of fellow expatriate painter John Singer Sargent, Stewart was nicknamed "the Parisian from Philadelphia".

Biography
His father, the sugar millionaire William Hood Stewart, moved the family from Philadelphia, Pennsylvania to Paris in 1865, and became a distinguished art collector and an early patron of Marià Fortuny and the Barbizon artists. Julius studied under Eduardo Zamacois as a teenager, under Jean-Léon Gérôme at the École des Beaux-Arts, and later was a pupil of Raymondo de Madrazo.

Stewart's family wealth enabled him to live a lush expatriate life and paint what he pleased, often large-scaled group portraits. The first of these, After the Wedding (Drexel University Art Collection, 1880), showed the artist's brother Charles and his bride Mae, daughter of financier Anthony J. Drexel, leaving for their honeymoon. Subsequent group portraits depicted his friends — including actresses, celebrities and aristocrats — often with a self-portrait somewhere in the crowd.

He exhibited regularly at the Paris Salon from 1878 into the early 20th century, and helped organize the "Americans in Paris" section of the 1894 Salon. The Baptism (Los Angeles County Museum of Art, 1892), which reportedly depicts a gathering of the Vanderbilt family, was shown at the 1893 Chicago World's Columbian Exposition, and received acclaim at the 1895 Berlin International Exposition.

He painted a series of sailing pictures aboard James Gordon Bennett, Jr.'s yacht Namouna. The most accomplished of these, On the Yacht "Namouna", Venice (Wadsworth Atheneum, 1890), showed a sailing party on deck and included a portrait of the actress Lillie Langtry. Another, Yachting on the Mediterranean (1896), set a record price for the artist, selling in 2005 for US$2.3 million.

Late in life, he turned to religious subjects, but Stewart is best remembered for his Belle Époque society portraits and sensuous nudes.

Selected works

Horse Trough on a Cuban Plantation (1876), Pennsylvania Academy of the Fine Arts, Philadelphia, Pennsylvania
After the Wedding (aka Parisian Wedding) (1880), Drexel University Museum, Philadelphia, Pennsylvania
Five O'Clock Tea (1884), Iris & B. Gerald Cantor collection, New York City
The Hunt Ball (1885), Essex Club, Newark, New Jersey. Includes portraits of the actress Lillie Langtry and Baron Rothschild.
On the Yacht "Namouna", Venice (1890), Wadsworth Atheneum, Hartford, Connecticut
The Baptism (1892), Los Angeles County Museum of Art Reportedly, this shows a gathering of the Vanderbilt family.
Yachting on the Mediterranean (1896), private collection
The Goldsmith Ladies ... in a Peugeot (1897), Musée du Château de Compiègne, France
La Clairiere (The Glade) (1900), Detroit Institute of Arts
Les Nymphes de Nysa (The Nymphs of Nysa) (1900), Musée d'Orsay, Paris
Portrait of Mrs. Francis Stanton Blake (1908), Walters Art Museum, Baltimore, Maryland

References
Ulrich W. Hiesinger, Julius LeBlanc Stewart, American Painter of the Belle Epoque, exhibition catalogue, Vance Jordan Fine Art, Inc. (New York 1998)

External links

Spring Flowers (In the Conservatory) (1890), Phoenix Art Museum
Julius Leblanc Stewart Works list

1855 births
1919 deaths
19th-century American painters
19th-century American male artists
American male painters
20th-century American painters
Painters from Pennsylvania
American alumni of the École des Beaux-Arts
Artists from Philadelphia
American expatriates in France
20th-century American male artists